Roderick Harold Clive Pringle (January 8, 1871 – May 2, 1920) was a Canadian Senator and lawyer.

Pringle was born in Grafton, Ontario and was educated at Trinity College School in Port Hope, Ontario. He earned a Bachelor of Arts degree from what was then Trinity University in Toronto and was called to the bar in Ontario in 1894. In 1898, he was called to the bar of British Columbia and set up a law practice in Greenwood, British Columbia. In 1903, he relocated to Ottawa, Ontario where he continued his law practice.

He was appointed to the Senate of Canada by Sir Robert Borden in 1917 and sat as a Conservative for Ontario until his death in 1920 at the age of 49 of a heart condition after a lengthy illness. He represented the Senatorial division of Cobourg, Ontario.

References

External links
 

1871 births
1920 deaths
Canadian senators from Ontario
Conservative Party of Canada (1867–1942) senators
Lawyers in Ontario
People from Northumberland County, Ontario